The New England Society in the City of New York (NES) is one of several lineage organizations in the United States and one of the oldest charitable societies in the country. It was founded in 1805 to promote “friendship, charity and mutual assistance” among and on behalf of New Englanders living in New York.

History
The founding NES meeting was held on May 6, 1805 at the State Street home of merchant, statesman, and first NES president 
James Watson. Watson’s Federal townhouse still stands and is on the National Register of Historic Places. It was also the residence of Elizabeth Ann Seton, the first American Catholic Saint. The home is currently occupied by the rectory of the Our Lady of the Holy Rosary Church and is part of the Seton Shrine.

The first Annual Dinner was held on December 21, 1805 at the City Hotel on Broadway with 154 Members in attendance. Every year since 1805, the Society has hosted speakers at various venues, including Delmonico's Restaurant, the Waldorf-Astoria Hotel, and Sherry’s in New York City. The roster of speakers who attended these Dinners includes Commander Stephen Decatur, War of 1812 Hero, statesman Daniel Webster, U.S. President Ulysses S. Grant., J. Pierpont Morgan (the 26th NES President), Theodore Roosevelt, Ralph Waldo Emerson, Mark Twain (Samuel Clemens) and Woodrow Wilson.

In 1885 the New England Society of New York donated the statue The Pilgrim to New York City. The statue faces westward on the crest of a little knoll at the top of the hill, on a rusticated Quincy granite pedestal that was created by architect Richard Morris Hunt, overlooking the East Drive at East 72nd Street.

Education
In 1953, NES expanded its educational outreach and launched the NES Scholarship Program to provide access to higher education to deserving young scholars.  NES provides funding for New York City students attending colleges and universities in New England.

Membership
The Society currently maintains its headquarters in midtown Manhattan.  Full membership requires evidence of New England ancestry, education, or residence; associate membership is available to those who share an affinity for New England and the mission of NES.

Notable members
Chester A. Arthur
William T. Blodgett
William Cullen Bryant
Grover Cleveland
Calvin Coolidge 
Horace Greeley 
Rush Christopher Hawkins 
Morris K. Jessup 
John F. Kennedy
Seth Low
Nathaniel Frary Miller
J.P. Morgan
Levi P. Morton 
Charles Pratt 
John D. Rockefeller 
Theodore Roosevelt
Elihu Root
Elliott Fitch Shepard
Charles Tiffany 
John Trumbull

References

External links

Cultural history of New York City
Clubs and societies in the United States
Lineage societies
Organizations based in New York City
1805 establishments in New York (state)